In enzymology, a pyrithiamine deaminase is an enzyme that catalyzes the chemical reaction

1-(4-amino-2-methylpyrimid-5-ylmethyl)-3-(beta-hydroxyethyl)-2- methylpyridinium bromide + H2O  1-(4-hydroxy-2-methylpyrimid-5-ylmethyl)-3-(beta-hydroxyethyl)-2- methylpyridinium bromide + NH3

The 3 substrates of this enzyme are 1-(4-amino-2-methylpyrimid-5-ylmethyl)-3-(beta-hydroxyethyl)-2-, methylpyridinium bromide, and H2O, whereas its 3 products are 1-(4-hydroxy-2-methylpyrimid-5-ylmethyl)-3-(beta-hydroxyethyl)-2-, methylpyridinium bromide, and NH3.

This enzyme belongs to the family of hydrolases, those acting on carbon-nitrogen bonds other than peptide bonds, specifically in cyclic amidines.  The systematic name of this enzyme class is 1-(4-amino-2-methylpyrimid-5-ylmethyl)-3-(beta-hydroxyethyl)-2-methy lpyridinium-bromide aminohydrolase.

References

 

EC 3.5.4
Enzymes of unknown structure